Brandon David Keith Bailey (born October 19, 1994) is an American professional baseball pitcher who is a free agent. He has previously played in Major League Baseball (MLB) for the Houston Astros, with whom he made his MLB debut.

Amateur career
Bailey attended Broomfield High School in Broomfield, Colorado, and he pitched for the school's baseball team. As a junior, he had a 10–0 win–loss record and a 1.02 earned run average and 107 strikeouts. During the summer between his junior and senior years, he tore the ulnar collateral ligament in his pitching elbow. He underwent Tommy John surgery, causing him to miss his senior year.

Bailey enrolled at Gonzaga University and played college baseball for the Gonzaga Bulldogs. In 2015, he played collegiate summer baseball for the Yarmouth–Dennis Red Sox of the Cape Cod Baseball League.

Professional career

Oakland Athletics
The Oakland Athletics selected him in the sixth round of the 2016 MLB draft. He signed with Oakland and spent his first professional season with both the AZL Athletics and the Vermont Lake Monsters, posting a combined 3–1 record and 2.93 ERA in 12 games between both teams.

In 2017, Bailey spent with the Beloit Snappers and the Stockton Ports, pitching to a 3–2 record and 3.26 ERA in 24 total games.

Houston Astros
After the 2017 season, the Athletics traded Bailey to the Astros for Ramón Laureano. In 2018, Bailey split the season between the Buies Creek Astros and the Corpus Christi Hooks, accumulating a 6–8 record with a 2.80 ERA in 121 innings.

Bailey spent the 2019 season with Corpus Christi, going 4–5 with a 3.30 ERA over  innings. On December 12, 2019, Bailey was selected by the Baltimore Orioles with the second selection of the 2019 Rule 5 draft. On March 6, 2020, Bailey was returned to the Astros' organization. With expanded rosters due to COVID-19, he was a member of the Astros' Opening Day roster. On July 26, 2020, he made his MLB debut.

Cincinnati Reds
On November 20, 2020, Bailey was traded to the Cincinnati Reds in exchange for cash considerations. On February 26, 2021, Bailey underwent Tommy John surgery, causing him to miss the 2021 season. On March 29, 2021, Bailey was placed on the 60-day injured list.
On November 30, 2021, Bailey was non-tendered by the Reds, making him a free agent. On December 1, Bailey re-signed with the Reds. He elected free agency on November 10, 2022.

See also
Rule 5 draft results

References

External links

1994 births
Living people
Arizona League Athletics players
Baseball players from Colorado
Beloit Snappers players
Buies Creek Astros players
Corpus Christi Hooks players
Gonzaga Bulldogs baseball players
Houston Astros players
Major League Baseball pitchers
People from Westminster, Colorado
Sportspeople from the Denver metropolitan area
Stockton Ports players
Vermont Lake Monsters players
Yarmouth–Dennis Red Sox players